The Cuba Adventist Theological Seminary (Spanish: Seminario Teológico Adventista de Cuba) is a Seventh-day Adventist theology school located in Havana, Cuba. It prepares men and women to serve the church and community in a climate of growing religious liberty.

History
Cuba Adventist Theological Seminary has its antecedent in Antillian Union College (now Antillean Adventist University) which started in Cuba in 1922 but moved to Puerto Rico following the 1959 Cuban Revolution.  In 1969 a seminary was started at the headquarters of the church in Cuba, and in 1985 it developed a relationship with the University of Montemorelos in Mexico as an extension school bringing the facility up to more universally accepted standards.  In 1996 the seminary moved to a new campus built by Maranatha Volunteers International, and in 2008 it won full accreditation by the Adventist Accrediting Association (AAA).  It is also one of the ten sites in the region where Inter-American Adventist Theological Seminary courses are offered.

See also
List of Seventh-day Adventist colleges and universities
Religion in Cuba
Christianity in Cuba
Protestantism in Cuba
Religion in Latin America

References

External links

Education in Havana
Educational institutions established in 1969
Seventh-day Adventist education
Universities and colleges in Cuba
1969 establishments in Cuba